St. Edward's Parish is a Roman Catholic church, rectory, convent and coeducational grammar school located on the northwest side of Chicago founded in 1899.  It is within the Roman Catholic Archdiocese of Chicago.

Pastors
Rev. Thomas J. McCormick, C.S.V. (1899-1903)
Rev. J. J. Cregan, C.S.V. (1903-1916)
Rev. Thomas J. McCormick, C.S.V. (1916-1918)
Rev. John J. Corbett, C.S.V.(1918-1931)
Rev. John J. O'Hearn (1931-1951)
Rev. Cornelius J. Corkery (1951-1955)
Rt. Rev. Msgr. John W. Schmid (1955-1967)
Rev. Albert J. Buckley (1967-1981)
Rev. John J. Donahue (1981-1991)
Rev. John M. Murphy (1992-2004)
Rev. Edward A. Carlson (2004-2010)
Rev. Michael J. Cronin (2010 to 2019)
Rev. Dominic Clemente (2019 to present)

References

Dominican churches in the United States
Catholic schools in Chicago
Roman Catholic churches in Chicago
Religious organizations established in 1899
1899 establishments in Illinois